Motometer (historical names: Moto Meter, MotoMeter, Moto-Meter, MM) is a brand, known for measuring and displaying instruments for workshops and vehicle equipment. The originally independent company was founded at the beginning of the 20th century in the area of Stuttgart (South Germany). Until its insolvency in 1995, the Moto Meter AG was listed on the Frankfurt Stock Exchange.

History 
In the year 1912, a Swabian inventor started the development of practical tools as well as measuring- and displaying instruments for workshops and vehicle equipment companies. Some of the instruments developed at the beginnings of Motometer's traditional history can still be found in workshops today, such as the Recording Compression Tester or the Tyre Pressure Tester. In 1925 the Moto-Meter-GmbH (Frankfurt a.M.) was mentioned in business documents for the first time. One year later, the company was listed in the Commercial Registry Stuttgart as “Moto Meter Hermann Schlaich GmbH”. 

In 1966, the Moto Meter Hermann Schlaich GmbH owned four production plants (Stuttgart, Leonberg, Neckarhausen and Nagold), where 1100 people were employed. The documents of the Moto Meter Hermann Schlaich GmbH could be found in the archive for corporate publications in the German Museum (Deutsches Museum) in Munich today. In 1969 the company changed the firm’s name into Moto Meter GmbH, the head office was placed in Leonberg. In 1977 the Moto Meter GmbH was incorporated.

In 1991, the Moto Meter AG had been taken over by the Robert Bosch GmbH. Bosch/Motometer held in 1991 a market share of approx. 10% in the strong concentrated market of displaying instruments and ranked third therewith. Market leaders were Magneti Marelli and VDO in these times. Bosch/Motometer delivered 95% of the instrument panels, which were installed by the German vehicle manufacturers.

In 1992 the company changed the firm’s name into MM Messtechnik GmbH; the MM Messtechnik GmbH closed a contract with the Robert Bosch GmbH. In 1996 the IVEKA Automotive Technologies Schauz GmbH was founded in Mühlacker, assumed the brand Motometer and continued with its distribution and commercialisation. 

During the liquidation of the Moto Meter AG through the Robert Bosch GmbH the Federal Constitutional Court of Germany it was decided due to the appeal of the German Association for the Protection of Small Shareholders that each liquidation through a majority shareholder had to be checked judicially. The property appeal was dismissed due to insignificance, because the association held only two shares of the Moto Meter AG.

Today’s products and company structure 
The Motometer Group offers today a wide range of services and products, which varies from OEM-products (products for Original Equipment Manufacturers) and aftermarket products to customised solutions for small and medium-sized series.
The Motometer Group consists of three subdivisions. The trade-, distribution- and service-department, the development-department and the production-department, which are represented through three independent corporations.

External links 
 Official Website of IVEKA Automotive Technologies Schauz GmbH, the owner of the trademark.

References 

Automotive companies of Germany
Economy of Baden-Württemberg